Race Against Time is the sixth studio album released by English grime artist Wiley on Eskibeat Recordings on 8 June 2009. It is in contrast to his previous album released, See Clear Now (2008), a pop rap and electronic album that featured numerous top 40 hits.

It includes the single "Too Many Man" featuring Boy Better Know, also featured on Skepta's own album Microphone Champion (2009).

Track listing

References

2009 albums
Wiley (musician) albums